Christopher Lamont Young (born January 23, 1980) is a former American football safety who played for the Denver Broncos in the National Football League.

Career
Young was a three-year starter at Georgia Tech. He started with 35 consecutive games, beginning with the final game of his true freshman season. He was also a team captain. Young finished his career ranked 10th among all-time Georgia Tech defensive backs in career tackles with 219.  He was drafted in the 2002 NFL Draft by the Broncos.

References

External links
NFL.com player page

1980 births
Living people
People from Coweta County, Georgia
Sportspeople from the Atlanta metropolitan area
Players of American football from Georgia (U.S. state)
American football safeties
Georgia Tech Yellow Jackets football players
Denver Broncos players
Frankfurt Galaxy players
American expatriate sportspeople in Germany